South Carolina Highway 18 (SC 18) is a  primary state highway in the U.S. state of South Carolina. It serves to connect the cities of Union, Gaffney and Shelby, North Carolina.

Route description

SC 18 is a  two-lane rural highway.  In Gaffney, it goes through the downtown area along Fredrick Street and overlaps with the Overmountain Victory National Historic Trail.

History
SC 18 was established in 1938 as a renumbering of SC 111, from U.S. Route 29 (US 29) in Gaffney, to the North Carolina state line.  In 1940, SC 18 was extended south along new primary routing to SC 9 in Pacolet.  In 1942, it was extended again along new primary routing to SC 56 south of Glenn Springs.  In 1960-1961, SC 18 was rerouted at Gaffney to US 176/SC 9 in Jonesville, replacing part of SC 11; its old alignment became part of SC 150.  In 1989, SC 18 was extended to its current western terminus at US  176/SC 215, replacing part of US 176 and all of US 176 Bus.

South Carolina Highway 18 (1922–1938)

The first SC 18 was an original state highway, established in 1922 between SC 20 in Abbeville northwest to Anderson and then northwest to SC 17 in Westminster. The next year, it was extended north-northeast to SC 2 in Walhalla. Two or three years later, its Westminster–Walhalla segment was eliminated, and it was routed from Westminster to the Georgia state line northwest of Long Creek. Its former path was redesignated as SC 183. In 1933, its western terminus was truncated to Westminster, to an intersection with US 76 and SC 13. Its former path was redesignated as part of US 76. In 1938, SC 18 was redesignated as part of SC 28 from Abbeville to Anderson and SC 24 from Anderson to Westminster.

Antreville alternate route

South Carolina Highway 18 Alternate (SC 18 Alt.) was an alternate route that existed in Antreville. It was established in November 1936 between SC 184 and SC 18 (now SC 28). In 1938, it was decommissioned and redesignated as SC 28 Alt. Today, it is a secondary road.

Major intersections

Special routes

Union truck route

South Carolina Highway 18 Truck (SC 18 Truck) is a  truck route that travels along Duncan Bypass, in concurrency with US 176/SC 215, then reconnects with SC 18 at Connector Road.

Union connector route

South Carolina Highway 18 Connector (SC 18 Conn) is a  hidden designation between SC 18 and U.S. Route 176 (US 176)/SC 215, via Harwood Heights. It serves as a direct route to Buffalo from downtown Union.

Gaffney connector route

South Carolina Highway 18 Connector (SC 18 Conn.) is the hidden designation of Logan Street, between SC 18 and U.S. Route 29 (US 29). However, this route is signed as mainline SC 18 throughout, despite county and state maps indicating its official routing is along Limestone Street.

Gaffney alternate route 1

South Carolina Highway 18 Alternate (SC 18 Alt.) was an alternate route in Gaffney. It was established in 1938 as a redesignation of SC 111 Alt. between U.S. Route 29 (US 29) and SC 18. In 1940, it was decommissioned and became part of the mainline route.

Gaffney alternate route 2

South Carolina Highway 18 Alternate (SC 18 Alt.) was an alternate route in Gaffney. It was established in 1940 as a redesignation of the SC 18 mainline between Limestone Street and U.S. Route 29 (US 29). In 1947, it was decommissioned and became part of SC 18 Conn. Today, it is part of SC 18 again.

See also

References

External links

 
 SC 18 at Virginia Highways' South Carolina Highways Annex
 Former SC 18 Alt. at Virginia Highways' South Carolina Highways Annex

018
Transportation in Union County, South Carolina
Transportation in Cherokee County, South Carolina
Gaffney, South Carolina